27 Cancri is a single star in the zodiac constellation of Cancer, located around 990 light-years away from the Sun. It is visible to the naked eye as a faint, red-hued star with a typical apparent visual magnitude of around +5.56. The star is moving closer to the Earth with a heliocentric radial velocity of −8.3 km/s. It is a member of the Arcturus stream, a group of stars with high proper motion and metal-poor properties thought to be the remnants of a small galaxy consumed by the Milky Way.

This is an aging red giant with a stellar classification of M3 IIIa, currently on the asymptotic giant branch. It is classified as a semiregular variable star of type SRb and its brightness varies from magnitude +5.41 to +5.75 with a period of 40 days. The star is radiating around 2,455 times the Sun's luminosity from its enlarged photosphere at an effective temperature of 3,574 K.

References

M-type giants
Semiregular variable stars
Asymptotic-giant-branch stars
Arcturus moving group
Cancer (constellation)
Durchmusterung objects
Cancri, 27
071250
041400
3319
Cancri, BP